Genaro (from the Latin Januarius, meaning "devoted to Janus") is the surname of the following notable people:
Donald Genaro (born 1932), American industrial designer
Frankie Genaro (1901–1966), American boxer
Joseph Genaro (born 1962), American musician and songwriter
Juma Genaro (born 1982), South Sudanese football goalkeeper
Mary DeGenaro (born 1961), American jurist
Si Genaro (born 1971), British musician
Tony Genaro (1942–2014), American film, television and stage actor

See also
Gennaro (disambiguation)